Mailhoc is a commune in the Tarn department in southern France.

Geography
The Vère forms part of the commune's eastern border, then flows westward through the middle of the commune.

See also
Communes of the Tarn department

References

Communes of Tarn (department)